The 2016 Portuguese presidential election was held on 24 January. This election chose the successor to the President Aníbal Cavaco Silva, who was constitutionally not allowed to run for a third consecutive term.

Marcelo Rebelo de Sousa, the candidate supported by PPD/PSD, CDS-PP and PPM, won the election on the first round with 52% of the vote. Marcelo also won in every single district in the country and only lost a few municipalities in the south of the country. Turnout was higher than that of the 2011 election, but reached a record low in a presidential election with no incumbents as only 48.66% of the electorate cast a ballot.

Background and election procedure
Aníbal Cavaco Silva had served two consecutive five-year terms as president, the maximum number, and the 2016 election was to choose a successor for a term beginning on March 9. In Portugal, the president is the head of state, has mostly ceremonial powers. However, the president does have some political influence and can dissolve the Parliament of Portugal if a crisis occurs. The president also has an official residence in the Belém Palace in Lisbon.

In order to stand for election, candidates had to each gather 7,500 signatures of support one month before the election, and submit them to the Constitutional Court of Portugal. On December 29, 2015, the Constitutional Court certified ten candidates as having met the requirements to appear on the ballot. This was a record number; the highest number of presidential candidates had previously been six.

Under Portuguese law, a candidate must receive a majority of votes (50% plus one vote) to be elected. If no candidate achieved a majority in the first round, a runoff election (i.e., second round, held between the two candidates who received the most votes in the first round) would have been held on February 14.

Portugal had about 9.7 million registered voters by election day.

Candidates

Official candidates
Henrique Neto, member and former MP of the Socialist Party.
António Sampaio da Nóvoa, independent candidate and former rector of the University of Lisbon (2006–2013), supported by LIVRE and the PCTP/MRPP. The Socialist Party urged its supporters to either vote for him or Maria de Belém.
Cândido Ferreira, nephrologist MD, independent candidate and former leader of Leiria district branch of the Socialist Party.
Edgar Silva, regional MP for the Legislative Assembly of Madeira from the Portuguese Communist Party, supported by the Portuguese Communist Party.
Jorge Sequeira, psychologist, researcher and university professor.
Vitorino Silva, paver and former president of the parish of Rans, also a former member of the Socialist Party, more commonly known as Tino de Rans.
Marisa Matias, sociologist who has worked in the areas of environment and public health, and European MEP of the European United Left–Nordic Green Left, supported by the Left Bloc and the MAS.
Maria de Belém, former president of the Socialist Party (2011-2014) The Socialist Party urged its supporters to either vote for her or António Sampaio da Nóvoa.
Marcelo Rebelo de Sousa, former leader of the Social Democratic Party (1996–1999), supported by the Social Democratic Party and the CDS – People's Party.
Paulo de Morais, independent candidate, former deputy mayor of Porto (2002–2005), anti-corruption activist.
                                                                           
|

Unsuccessful candidates
Manuel João Vieira, independent candidate.
Manuel Almeida, independent.
Paulo Freitas do Amaral, university professor, former mayor of Oeiras; withdrew and supported Marcelo Rebelo de Sousa.
Orlando Cruz, withdrew in favour of Marcelo Rebelo de Sousa.
Graça Castanho, withdrew due to having lost her nomination signatures in a storm.
Castanheira Barros, independent candidate, former member of the Social Democratic Party; withdrew and supported Marcelo Rebelo de Sousa.
Manuela Gonzaga, historian and writer; was supported by the People–Animals–Nature.

Decided not to run
Fernando Nobre, Independent candidate which had contested the previous presidential election.
António Vitorino, former European Commissioner (1999–2004).
Paulo Portas, former leader of the CDS – People's Party (1998–2005, 2007–2016), former Minister of National Defence (2002–2005) and of Foreign Affairs (2011–2013) and also former Deputy Prime Minister (2013–2015).
Manuela Ferreira Leite, former leader of the Social Democratic Party (2008–2010).
António Guterres, former Prime Minister (1995–2002).
Manuel Carvalho da Silva, former union leader of CGTP (1986–2012).
Pedro Santana Lopes, former Prime Minister (2004–2005).
Rui Rio, former mayor of Porto (2002–2013).
Alberto João Jardim, former President of the Regional Government of Madeira (1978-2015).

Campaign period

Candidates' slogans

Candidates' debates
There were several number of debates between all the candidates in the three TV networks RTP, SIC, TVI. There was a radio debate between all candidates plus on January 19, there was a final debate between all of candidates on RTP1.

Completed televised debates:

Opinion polling

Campaign budgets

Results

|-
!style="background-color:#E9E9E9;text-align:left;" colspan="2" rowspan="2"|Candidates 
!style="background-color:#E9E9E9;text-align:left;" rowspan="2"|Supporting parties 	
!style="background-color:#E9E9E9;text-align:right;" colspan="2"|First round
|-
!style="background-color:#E9E9E9;text-align:right;"|Votes
!style="background-color:#E9E9E9;text-align:right;"|%
|-
|style="width: 10px" bgcolor=#FF9900 align="center" | 
|align=left|Marcelo Rebelo de Sousa
|align=left|Social Democratic Party, People's Party, People's Monarchist Party
|align="right" |2,413,956
|align="right" |52.00
|-
|style="width: 5px" bgcolor=#d11a91 align="center" | 
|align=left|António Sampaio da Nóvoa
|align=left|Independent 
|align="right" |1,062,138
|align="right" |22.88
|-
|style="width: 5px" bgcolor=darkred align="center" | 
|align=left|Marisa Matias
|align=left|Left Bloc, Socialist Alternative Movement
|align="right" |469,814
|align="right" |10.12
|-
|style="width: 5px" bgcolor=#777777 align="center" | 
|align=left|Maria de Belém
|align=left|Independent
|align="right" |196,765
|align="right" |4.24
|-
|style="width: 5px" bgcolor=red align="center" | 
|align=left|Edgar Silva
|align=left|Portuguese Communist Party, Ecologist Party "The Greens"
|align="right" |183,051
|align="right" |3.94
|-
|style="width: 5px" bgcolor=#777777 align="center" | 
|align=left|Vitorino Silva
|align=left|Independent
|align="right" |152,374
|align="right" |3.28
|-
|style="width: 5px" bgcolor=#777777 align="center" | 
|align=left|Paulo de Morais
|align=left|Independent
|align="right" |100,191
|align="right" |2.16
|-
|style="width: 5px" bgcolor=#777777 align="center" | 
|align=left|Henrique Neto
|align=left|Independent
|align="right" |39,163
|align="right" |0.84
|-
|style="width: 5px" bgcolor=#777777 align="center" | 
|align=left|Jorge Sequeira
|align=left|Independent
|align="right" |13,954
|align="right" |0.30
|-
|style="width: 5px" bgcolor=#777777 align="center" | 
|align=left|Cândido Ferreira
|align=left|Independent
|align="right" |10,609
|align="right" |0.23
|-
|colspan="3" align=left style="background-color:#E9E9E9"|Total valid
|width="65" align="right" style="background-color:#E9E9E9"|4,642,015
|width="40" align="right" style="background-color:#E9E9E9"|100.00
|-
|align=right colspan="3"|Blank ballots
|width="65" align="right" |58,964
|width="40" align="right" |1.24
|-
|align=right colspan="3" |Invalid ballots
|width="65" align="right"|43,588
|width="40" align="right"|0.92
|-
|colspan="3" align=left style="background-color:#E9E9E9"|Total
|width="65" align="right" style="background-color:#E9E9E9"|4,744,597
|width="40" align="right" style="background-color:#E9E9E9"|
|-
|colspan=3|Registered voters/turnout
||9,751,398||48.66
|-
|colspan=5 align=left|Source: Comissão Nacional de Eleições
|}

Maps

See also
 President of Portugal
 Politics of Portugal

Notes

References

External links
 Official results site, Portuguese Justice Ministry
 Portuguese Electoral Commission
 ERC - Official publication of polls

2016 elections in Portugal
2016
January 2016 events in Portugal
2016